Cossus afghanistana is a moth in the family Cossidae. It is found in Afghanistan.

References

Natural History Museum Lepidoptera generic names catalog

Cossus
Moths described in 1953
Moths of Asia